is a Japanese footballer who plays for FC Machida Zelvia.

Career
Shimoda play a great part in Senshu University's success in football, as he was named MVP of Kanto University Football Association in 2013, just before joining Ventforet Kofu for the incoming season of 2014.

After two season in Yamanashi Prefecture, he signed for Shonan Bellmare for 2016, coming back to his home town.

Club statistics
Updated to 22 February 2019.

References

External links
Profile at Kawasaki Frontale
Profile at Shonan Bellmare

1991 births
Living people
Senshu University alumni
Association football people from Kanagawa Prefecture
People from Hiratsuka, Kanagawa
Japanese footballers
J1 League players
J2 League players
Ventforet Kofu players
Shonan Bellmare players
Kawasaki Frontale players
Oita Trinita players
FC Machida Zelvia players
Association football midfielders
Universiade bronze medalists for Japan
Universiade medalists in football
Medalists at the 2013 Summer Universiade